A circulus is a rarely occurring reptilian social group where there is interaction and personal exchange between individuals. Members will often protect and defend young, even if not of direct genetic linkage.  Circulus is a Latin based term; one definition of the word is "a social gathering or circle company".
Most reptiles are indifferent socially to each other as adults or to offspring.

Behaviours
Among crocodilians and certain lizards, there is a much greater interaction between members.  Young will be guarded and defended for a considerable period of time.  Crocodilians of both sexes carry and assist young hatchlings to the water and guard them.  The gharial (Gavialis gangeticus) has to nudge young to the water because their teeth are too sharp to carry them. Sub-adult members of a crocodilian social group will often stand by a female laying eggs or retrieving young from a nest to keep predators away.  The female Asian forest tortoise (Manouria emys) has been reported to guard a nest site for a short period after egg laying but this instinct is very short lived.

In stump-tailed skinks (Tiliqua rugosa) and Solomon Islands skinks (Corucia spp), long term bonding of pairs with each other and other members has been recorded.  In the case of Corucia, orphaned young have been observed being adopted into the circulus.

The social bond and parental attention of reptiles appears equal in circulus containing egg-laying reptiles compared to those with live bearing reptiles.  Another case of egg-laying lizards with a circulus is the red-eyed crocodile skink (Tribolonotus gracilis).  The female will sit on the egg and guard the young.  As in the case of Corucia, the young tend to stay close to the parents, especially, the mother who guards the neonate.  The young skink will often climb on the abaxial area of the female or male for protection and security, just as in the case of the Solomon Islands skink (Corucia zebrata).

References

Further reading
 Bustard, H.R.; Moharana, S.; 1985. Captive Breeding of the Gharial (Gavalis gangetius-underlined). ASRA The Journal of the Association for the Study of Reptilia and Amphibia. 2(4): pp. 23–45.
 Hauschild, Andree; Gassner, Paul; 1999. Corucia zebrata Der Wickelschwanzskink Terrarien Biblothek Natur und Tier – verlag 79 pp.
 Parker, F. 1983. The prehensile-tailed skink (Corucia zebrata) on Bougainville Island, Papua New Guinea. In: Rhodin, A. & K. Miyata (eds.). Advances in Herpetology and Evolutionary Biology. Harvard Univ. Press, Cambridge. pp. 435–440.
 Ruston W. Hartdegen, Matthew J. Russell, Bruce Young, and Richard D. Reams (1909) Vocalization of the Crocodile skink Tribolonotus gracilis (DeRooy, 1909), and evidence of parental care. Contemporary Herpetology 2001 Number 2 18 July 2001 ISSN 1094-2246
 Schnirel, Brian L. 2004. Seni biometric analysis on the extinct Scincidae species: Macroscincus coctei. Underlined Polyphemos, Volume 2, Issue 1, May, Florence, South Carolina, U.S.A. May pp. 12–22.
 Schnirel, Brian L.; Jones, Sherri L.; 2006. Measurements on Increase in Girth and weight in the Scincidae species: Corucia zebrata – underlined. Polyphemos, Florence, South Carolina, U.S.A. pp. 1–3

External links
 Reptilia zoo Monkey skink addition

Ethology
Herpetology